Walter Slotheby was three times the member of Parliament for Great Grimsby in the 1390s.

References 

Year of birth missing
Year of death missing
English MPs January 1390
Members of the Parliament of England for Great Grimsby
English MPs 1394
English MPs 1399